Gotthard Jedlicka (6 May 1899 in Zurich — 9 November 1965 in Duisburg) was a Swiss art historian and writer.

Biography
Jedlicka studied art history in Zurich, Grenoble and Paris and became a teacher in a secondary school in Winterthur, canton of Zurich.

He earned a doctorate in 1928 and was promoted to professor in 1934. From 1939 to 1965 he was professor of art history at the University of Zurich. Besides, he was an editor of the magazine Galerie und Sammler and of the art book series of Scherz-Verlag. He was also an editor of the Swiss monthly magazine Werk. Moreover, he wrote several art books and monographies about artists such as Toulouse-Lautrec, Édouard Manet and Pieter Brueghel the Elder. His work is preserved by the Zurich Central Library.

In 1951, Jedkicka became a member of the German Academy for Language and Literature.

He was buried at Enzenbühl Cemetery.

Works (selection)
 Henri de Toulouse-Lautrec. Laupen, 1929 (dissertation, University of Zurich, Department of Philosophy I, 1929, 28 pages)
Henri Matisse. Chronique du jour, Paris, 1930, (200 issues)
Begegnungen. Künstlernovellen. Schwabe, Basel, 1933
Pieter Bruegel. Der Maler in seiner Zeit. Rentsch, Erlenbach, 1938
Edouard Manet. Rentsch, Erlenbach, 1941
Spanische Malerei. Atlantis Verlag, 1941
Zur schweizerischen Malerei der Gegenwart. Rentsch, Erlenbach, 1947
Pierre Bonnard. Ein Besuch. Rentsch, Erlenbach, 1949
Pariser Tagebuch. Suhrkamp (Bibliothek Suhrkamp 18), Frankfurt am Main, 1953
Anblick und Erlebnis. Bildbetrachtungen. Suhrkamp (Bibliothek Suhrkamp 29), Frankfurt am Main 1955
Die Matisse Kapelle in Vence. Rosenkranzkapelle der Dominikanerinnen. Suhrkamp, Frankfurt am Main, 1955
Wege zum Kunstwerk. Begegnungen mit Kunst und Künstlern. Piper, Munich, 1960
Der Fauvismus. Büchergilde Gutenberg, Zürich, 1961
Max Gubler. Hrsg. von Friedel Jedlicka. Huber, Frauenfeld, 1970
Mit Henri Matisse in Paris 1931. Piet Meyer (Kleine Bibliothek 5), Basel 2008,

Bibliography

"Gotthard Jedlicka", Dictionary of Art Historians

External links

Swiss art historians
20th-century Swiss historians
Swiss male writers
Swiss magazine editors
German-language writers
Academic staff of the University of Zurich
Writers from Zürich
1899 births
1965 deaths